Lady Dunn may refer to:

Marcia Anastasia Christoforides, (1910–1994)
Lydia Dunn, Baroness Dunn (born 1941)